The Miss Perú 1995 pageant was held on March 19, 1995. That year, 23 candidates were competing for the national crown. The chosen winner represented Peru at the Miss Universe 1995. The rest of the finalists would enter in different pageants.

Placements

 The (^) means that there was supposed to be a Top 10. However, it was announced by the hosts at the live telecast during the Top 10 announcement that there was a tie for 10th place, thus making it a Top 11 at the end.

Special Awards

 Best Regional Costume - Puno - Milagros Cabanillas
 Miss Photogenic - Amazonas - Paola Dellepiane
 Miss Elegance - Puno - Milagros Cabanillas
 Miss Body - Huancavelica - Pilar Abed
 Best Hair - Pasco - Claudia Boero
 Miss Congeniality - Apurímac - Fiorella Rodriguez
 Most Beautiful Face - Amazonas - Paola Dellepiane

.

Delegates

Amazonas - Paola Dellepiane
Áncash - Ana Sofía Orezolli
Apurímac - Fiorella Rodríguez
Arequipa - Fanny Rodríguez 
Ayacucho - Massiel Calvo
Cajamarca - Ursula Carranza
Callao - Patricia Gómez
Cuzco - Karin Mur
Huancavelica - Pilar Abed
Huánuco - Ljuvitza Vodanovic
Ica - Verónica Catter
Junín - Maricielo Effio

La Libertad - Catherine Tantaleán 
Lambayeque - Paola Boza
Loreto - Mariana Puyo
Madre de Dios - Romy Cubillas
Moquegua - Bárbara Seminario
Pasco - Claudia Boero
Piura - Lorena Prado 
Puno - Milagros Cabanillas
Region Lima - Michelle Clark
San Martín - Gabriela Rivera
Tumbes - Daysi Pasco

Judges

 Fernando Andrade Carmona - Mayor of Miraflores District
 Rosalinda Serfaty - Soap Opera Actress
 Benjamin Kreimer - Former President of Miss Peru Org.
 Mariana Sovero McKay - Miss Peru 1989
 Teófilo Cubillas - Professional Peruvian Soccer player
 Javier Echevarría - Peruvian Actor
 Gina Scamarone - Public Relations Manager of TACA-Peru
 Javier Blanco - Regional Manager of San Antonio (Mineral water)
 Dr. Mario Drassinower - Plastic Surgeon
 Déborah de Souza - Miss Peru 1993

Background Music

Opening Show – Condor Pasa & Valicha (Instrumental)
Swimsuit Competition – Candy Dulfer - Pick up the pieces
Evening Gown Competition – Richard Clayderman - Piano Medley - (Just The Way You Are, Um dia de domingo, Heal The World & La Vie en Rose)

Special Guests Singers

Pedro Suárez-Vértiz - "No Pense que era Amor" & " Me Eleve"

References

Miss Peru
1995 in Peru
1995 beauty pageants